John Granby may refer to:

John Manners, Marquess of Granby (1721 – 1770), British soldier

See also
John Granby Clay (1766–1846), British Army general